Mount Frakes is a prominent shield volcano marking the highest elevation in the Crary Mountains, in Marie Byrd Land, Antarctica and is the third highest volcanic elevation on the continent.

The mountain was mapped by the USGS from surveys and U.S. Navy air photos, 1959–66. Named by US-ACAN for Lawrence A. Frakes, United States Antarctic Program geologist who worked three summer seasons in the Falkland Islands and Antarctica, 1964-65 through 1967–68.

See also
List of volcanoes in Antarctica
List of Ultras of Antarctica

References

Sources

External links
 "Mount Frakes, Antarctica" on Peakbagger

Polygenetic shield volcanoes
Volcanoes of Marie Byrd Land
Shield volcanoes
Crary Mountains